The State Union of Serbia and Montenegro participated in the Eurovision Song Contest twice: in  and in . Their debut appearance was a success, with the song "Lane moje" performed by Željko Joksimović finishing second. The following year, they placed seventh, courtesy of the band No Name with the song "Zauvijek moja". Following the 2006 Montenegrin independence referendum,  and  have participated in the contest as separate entities, making their independent debuts in 2007.

History
Yugoslavia, which included the territories of modern-day Serbia and Montenegro, had been participating in the Eurovision Song Contest since the fifth annual contest in 1961. It had debuted that year along with Spain and Finland becoming, the 14th participating country. Its best result occurred in 1989 when Yugoslavia won with "Rock Me" by Riva. Yugoslavia participated regularly until 1992, missing only the editions between 1977 and 1980 and the one in 1985. At the 1992 contest, following the breakup of Yugoslavia, Serbia and Montenegro competed representing FR Yugoslavia. FR Yugoslavia was banned from participating in the 1993 edition due to UN sanctions and Yugoslav wars. This marked the start of a decade-long absence from the contest for the territories.

In 2002, Serbia and Montenegro sent an application to take part in the 2003 contest, however, they were unable to take part after the European Broadcasting Union (EBU) decided that too many countries would be relegated if the country took part.

Serbia and Montenegro debuted at the 2004 contest with the song "Lane moje" performed by Željko Joksimović, finishing first in the semi-final and second in the final. The song has become popular amongst many Eurovision fans and it is often rated as one of the best non-winning songs.

The following year, Serbia and Montenegro was represented by band No Name with the song "Zauvijek moja" and placed seventh in final. No Name were close to becoming the national entry once more, for the 2006 contest in Athens, however since their 2006 win of Evropesma had been disputed due to allegations of tactical voting by the Radio-Television of Montenegro jury, UJRT, the national union of broadcasters, did not reach an agreement on sending them to the contest again. On 20 March 2006, Serbia and Montenegro officially withdrew from the Eurovision Song Contest 2006. The country did however participate in voting in final of the contest. The Eurovision semi-final was not broadcast in Montenegro in 2006, and so the votes from Serbia and Montenegro, were from Serbia alone.

After the Montenegrin referendum on independence and dissolution of the state union in June 2006, both countries sent separate entries to the Eurovision Song Contest 2007. Montenegro made their debut as an independent state and sent Stevan Faddy, while Serbia sent Marija Šerifović as their debut entrant. Her song "Molitva" ended up winning the contest for Serbia, bringing the 2008 contest to Belgrade the following year.

Participation overview

Awards

Marcel Bezençon Awards

Commentators and spokespersons

See also 
 Evropesma
 Yugoslavia in the Eurovision Song Contest
 Serbia in the Eurovision Song Contest
 Montenegro in the Eurovision Song Contest
 Serbia and Montenegro in the Junior Eurovision Song Contest

Notes and references

Notes

References

 
Former countries in the Eurovision Song Contest